Monica Tagoai (born 17 October 1998) is a New Zealand rugby union player.

Biography 
Originally from Samoa, Tagoai migrated with her family to New Zealand when she was three. She was attending St Mary's College when she debuted for Wellington against Waikato in 2016. She has made 22 appearances for Wellington since 2016.

Tagoai made her Black Ferns debut in their 67–6 thrashing of the United States at Soldier Field in 2018. She earned her second cap in Black Ferns 27–30 loss to France at Grenoble.

In 2021 Tagoai joined Hurricanes Poua for the inaugural 2022 season of Super Rugby Aupiki.

References

External links 

 Black Ferns Profile

1998 births
Living people
New Zealand female rugby union players
New Zealand women's international rugby union players